Seveci Rokotakala (born 29 May 1978) in Fiji is a footballer who plays as a midfielder for Navua in the Senior League (Second Tier) and the Fiji national football team.

References

1978 births
Living people
Fijian footballers
Fiji international footballers
Navua F.C. players
I-Taukei Fijian people
Lautoka F.C. players
2002 OFC Nations Cup players
2004 OFC Nations Cup players
Association football midfielders